Laurynas Beliauskas (born 3 May 1997) is a Lithuanian basketball player for Skyliners Frankfurt of the Basketball Bundesliga.

Professional career
Beliauskas made his debut with Neptunas Klaipeda during the 2014-15 season. He played in 2014–15 Euroleague Basketball Next Generation Tournament for BC Žalgiris youth. Although his team didn't make to the final, he won 3 point shootout contest.

National team career
He won bronze medals with the Lithuania national team in 2015 FIBA Europe Under-18 Championship.

References

External links
 Laurynas Beliauskas at fiba.com

1997 births
Living people
Basketball players from Klaipėda
BC Neptūnas players
BC Nevėžis players
BC Žalgiris-2 players
Liga ACB players
Lithuanian expatriate basketball people in Spain
Lithuanian men's basketball players
Obradoiro CAB players
Point guards
Skyliners Frankfurt players